In Sweden, a person must have a surname and one or more given names.  Two given names are common.  Surnames are inherited from the parents, in the order of "same as elder sibling, if any; specified by parents; or mother's last name," while given names must be chosen by the parents at birth.  The calling name (Swedish tilltalsnamn, French Prénom usuel) by which the person is normally identified in conversation, is in Scandinavian countries (and previously in France) one of the given names, not necessarily the first. In contexts where the full name is spelled out, the calling name is often indicated by an asterisk, by capital letters, or underlines or italics. For example, Märta Birgit* Nilsson is known as Birgit Nilsson, while Björn* Kristian Ulvaeus is known as Björn Ulvaeus.

Transition from patronymic to surname
In Scandinavia, surnames proper did not exist until the later middle ages. Instead, patronymics were used. Karlsson or Karlsdotter ("Karl's son", "Karl's daughter"). The latter ending, however, is very rare nowadays due to usually strictly patrilineal nature of surnames (thus, names such as Amelia Andersdotter is actually a recent creation). These were gradually replaced by permanent surnames starting with the nobility and clergy, followed by the middle classes. The vast majority of people adopted surnames only in the late 19th century, often taking patronymic surnames.

Latin and Greek names
The adoption of Latin names was first used by the Catholic clergy in the 15th century as scholarly publications were written in Latin. The given name was preceded by Herr (Sir), like Herr Lars, Herr Olof, Herr Hans, followed by a latinised form of patronymic names, e.g. Lars Petersson, latinised as Laurentius Petri. These were not hereditary per se as priests were not allowed to marry. Starting from the time of the Reformation, the latinised form of their birthplace (Laurentius Petri Gothus, from Östergötland) became a common naming practice for the clergy. These names became hereditary.

Another subsequent practice was the use of the Greek language with the ending with ander, the Greek word for man (e.g. Micrander, Mennander).

Names of Nobility
The Swedish nobility during medieval times did not have formalised naming conventions as letters of patent did not appear until 1420. The families of the uradel used names deriving from the crest of the house such as Brahe, Natt och Dag, Bielke, Sparre, Oxenstierna, Trolle, Bååt and Bonde. After formalising the Nobility as the first estate of the realm in 1626, family names became mandatory (sometimes disambiguation was needed) and the use of patronymics by the nobility fell out of use.

In the 17th and 18th centuries, the surname was only rarely the original family name of the ennobled; usually, a more imposing new name was chosen. This was a period which produced a myriad of two-word Swedish-language family names for the nobility; very favoured prefixes were Adler– (German for 'eagle'), Ehren– (German for 'honor', Swedish ära), Silfver– ('silver') and Gyllen– or Gylden- ('golden' or 'gilded'). Unlike a British peerage title ("Lord Somewhere"), such a name became the new surname of the whole house, and the old surname was dropped altogether. The ennoblement (in 1632) of Peder Joenson is a case in point, where the use of the old surname was discontinued and thus after the ennoblement Peder Gyllensvärd came into use. An illustration of the old name being modified by having an addition to it can be seen the ennoblement of the brothers Johan Henrik Lang and Lars Adam Lang (in 1772) taking the surname Langenskjöld.

Names prefixed with von or af (older spelling of "av", Sw: "from") which were commonly adopted in the 18th and 19th centuries respectively denote nobility, often in combination with a change to the original name. Examples include Carl Linnæus (also Carolus Linnæus) ennobled Carl von Linné, or af Donner from the German name Donner. When a nobleman was raised to higher rank, i.e. to friherre or greve, the new branch became its own house with a new name,  often by appending af and a place name, e.g.  Wachtmeister af Björkö, Wachtmeister af Johannishus, Wachtmeister af Mälsåker.

Ornamental Names
Starting in the 17th and gaining widespread popularity in the 18th century, people of the Swedish middle classes, particularly artisans and  town dwellers, adopted family names in imitation of the gentry. Ornamental family names joining two elements from birthplace or nature, such as Bergman ("mountain man"), Holmberg ("island mountain"), Lindgren ("linden branch"), Sandström ("sand stream") and Åkerlund ("field grove"), were quite frequent and remain common today.

Hereditary son names
During the 19th century the patronymics became permanent "son names". Before Sweden's family name regulation act (släktnamnsförordningen) of 1901, the patronymic was the most widely used instead of a surname.

Soldier Names
Another source of surnames was the Swedish allotment system, which from the mid-late 17th century was organised to maintain a standing army, and where a number of farms were grouped together and then supported a soldier with a small cottage and piece of land. The soldiers were often given names either describing their character (e.g. Modig 'brave', Skarp 'sharp' or Snygg 'clean'), weapons (e.g. Sabel 'sabre', Lans 'lance' or Sköld 'shield') or names joining two elements from nature as above. The name often followed the cottage rather than the soldier. These soldiers' names became actual surnames during the 19th century.

Farm Names
To disambiguate between several people with the same name in a community or parish, additional descriptions, usually the name of a farm, such as (Anders Larsson vid Dammen, 'Swedish Anders Larsson by the damm) could be used colloquially. These were not always recorded in church records.

In the region of Dalecarlia these farm names (Swedish: gårdsnamn) are often unique and put first in the name in genitive form, e.g. Ollas Anders Eriksson (Anders from Olla, son of Erik). As patronyms were replaced by surnames, these either became surnames proper (at the end) or continued to be used in the traditional way in combination with a new surname. This tradition is now recognised in law and the farm name appears before the given names in official records.

Outlawed/banned names 

When parents name their child the name must be registered with the Swedish Tax Agency (Swedish Skatteverket). Some names may be denied if they go against Swedish naming law. Some names that have been denied are:

 Metallica
 Superman
 Ikea
 "brfxxccxxmnpcccclllmmnprxvclmnckssqlbb11116" (pronounced "Albin")

See also
Name days in Sweden
Swedish name day list of 2001
Patronymic 
List of Swedish noble families

References

 
Swedish given names